Phasia aurigera is a species of tachinid fly.

Description
Body length 8-13mm.

Distribution
It is a Palaearctic species, known from the warmer parts of Europe, including southern France, southern Germany, southern Poland, and the Russian Far East.

Hosts
Hemiptera - Palomena prasina, Rhaphigaster nebulosa, Coreus marginatus, Gonocerus juniperi, Gonocerus acuteangulatus.

References

Phasiinae
Diptera of Europe
Insects described in 1860